The following is a list of medals, awards and decorations in use in Hungary. The state awards may be awarded only by the President of Hungary. The following honours are in order of precedence.

Hungarian Order of Saint Stephen

Hungarian Corvin Chain

Hungarian Order of Honour

Hungarian Order of Merit

Hungarian Cross of Merit

Remembrance Medal of 1956

Merit Medal for Home Hungary

Merit Medal for For Alliance (Hungary)

Wound Medal (Hungary)

Merit Medal for Service

NATO Accession Commemorative Medal

Distinguished Award for National Defense

Distinguished Award for the Golden Age

Preservation of Hungarian War Records Decoration

Service Medals for Officers

Service Medals for NCO's

Service Medals for NCO's

Service Medal for Flood Protection

First Exchange Fire Service Medal

Disaster Relief Service Medal

Migration Crisis Management Service Medal

NATO-EU-OSCE-UN Service Medal

Peacekeeping Service Medal

Independent Democratic Hungary Commemorative Medal

See also
 History of Hungary
 List of military decorations

External links

 State Decorations , Office of the President of the Republic of Hungary
 Hungary: Order of Merit of the Hungarian Republic (Civilian), Medals of the World
 1991 XXXI law enacting the order and cross of merit
 2011 CCII law (on the use of Hungary's coat of arms and flag, as well as awards) from njt.hu